Diwan Bahadur Satappa Ramanatha Muttaiya Ramaswami Chettiar (1872 – 5 November 1918) was an Indian businessman from the state of Tamil Nadu.

Early life 

Ramaswami Chettiar was born in 1872 to Muttaiya or Muthiah Chettiar of Chidambaram who was well known for his philanthropic activities. Muttaiya Chettiar had donated over twenty lakhs of rupees for the renovation of the Nataraja temple at Chidambaram. Ramaswami was the second son of Muttaiya Chettiar. His younger brother was Annamalai Chettiar.

Indian Bank 

In 1906, the Arbuthnot Bank, the biggest banking institution in Madras city, crashed leaving thousands penniless. As a result, the idea of an Indian-owned bank was floated. The Indian Bank eventually came into being the very same year. Ramaswami Chettiar was one of the founder-directors of the bank.

In 1907, Ramaswamy Chettiar resigned and was succeeded as director by his younger brother Annamalai Chettiar.

Philanthropic activities 

In 1912, Ramaswami Chettiar donated rupees one lakh to the Chidambaram Municipal Board for the construction of water-works in the town. Ramaswami Chettiar established the Ramaswami Chettiar Town High School in Chidambaram in 1913.

References 

 
 

1872 births
1918 deaths
Tamil businesspeople
People from British India
Mayors of places in Tamil Nadu
Dewan Bahadurs